American Dragon: Jake Long, or simply American Dragon, is an American animated television series. It was produced by Walt Disney Television Animation, created by Jeff Goode and co-developed by Eddie Guzelian and Matt Negrete. It premiered on Disney Channel on January 21, 2005, and ended on September 1, 2007. Fifty-two episodes were produced.

Premise

Set in the New York City borough of Manhattan, this animated series tells the story of a Chinese-American boy named Jake Long (voiced by Dante Basco), who must balance ordinary adolescence with the ability to change into a dragon. When he eventually unlocks his full potential and turns into the American Dragon, he has to overcome obstacles to protect the magical creatures living in the city, but as his ordinary self, Jake has issues with his deep crush on his schoolmate Rose (Mae Whitman) who, unbeknownst to Jake, has a dark, magical secret of her own: she is a natural dragon-slayer known as the Huntsgirl, a member of the Huntsclan, a cult of ninjas that slays mythical creatures and who Jake has fought consistently. The leader of the Huntsclan is the Huntsman (Jeff Bennett) who raised Rose.

Jake navigates the city with his two best friends – Trixie Carter (Miss Kittie) and Arthur P. "Spud" Spudinski (Charlie Finn). When Jake gets home, it is to an extended family who all live together: Jake, his sister, their parents, and Jake's maternal grandfather Lao Shi (Keone Young). Jonathan (Jeff Bennett), a businessman dad originally from the Midwest, is unaware that he is married into a family of dragons from his Chinese wife Susan (Lauren Tom) (who lacks any dragon abilities, which skipped her generation). Lao Shi trains Jake in the magical, mystical ways of the dragons. Jake also cares very deeply for his annoying, overachieving, and seemingly perfect younger sister Haley (Amy Bruckner) (a nascent dragon), despite feeling like he's stuck in her small shadow. Grandpa's cynical sidekick, a magical talking Shar-Pei named Fu Dog (John DiMaggio), is Jake's animal guardian and other best friend.

Episodes

Characters

Main
 Jacob Luke "Jake" Long (Dante Basco): a Chinese-American 13-year-old (14 years old in the second season) who is half-human, half-dragon. He is the titular American Dragon. His personality is that of a cool, laid-back skateboarder who talks in rapper slang. He has a keen awareness of the newest developments and styles, is self-assured, and likes video games, extreme sports, all sorts of music, and the occasional comic book. He had a crush on pretty blonde schoolmate Rose until he found out she was actually the Huntsgirl, but their dual identities are bound to stir up trouble. After numerous trials and tribulations over the course of the series, Jake and Rose finally get together in the final episode. A running gag involves the mention of his embarrassing secrets like having a teddy bear collection and sleeping with a nightlight to blemish his reputation. His dragon abilities include flight, fire breath, a prehensile tail, and sharp claws, along with highly strong senses.
 Luong Lao Shi (Keone Young): Jake's grandpa who was formerly the Chinese Dragon. He runs an electronic shop on Canal Street with the slogan "Never have a customer, never have a sale" alongside his only friend Fu Dog. His attempts at training Jake sometimes do more damage (to Jake's brain) than help. His name is a reference to the Chinese word for "teacher." In his youth in 1972, before his first encounter with the Dark Dragon, Jake's grandpa was known as Lucky Lao Shi.
 Fu Dog (John DiMaggio): a 600-year-old Shar-Pei and Lao Shi's only companion. Throughout his entire life, he and a hairless talking cat have fought over Fu's family amulet (causing famous disasters along the way). He is more "hip" than Lao Shi.
 Arthur P. "Spud" Spudinski (Charlie Finn): Jake's best friend, who is extremely loyal and somewhat slow. However, he comes up with intelligent things to say at random times. He also has the entire works of Shakespeare committed to memory. There is a chance that Spud is half-wizard (this is hinted when his grandfather happens to know the magic word to seal a Djinn back into a goblet). He also has a crush on the head cheerleader, Stacey, who hates him until they start dating near the end of the second season.
 Trixie Carter (Kittie Kaboom): Jake's other best friend, who is just as cool as he is. A witty, blunt, and sharp-tongued girl, a hardcore fashionista but also the most logical and mature of the group.
 Haley Kay Long (Amy Bruckner): Jake's seven-year-old intelligent, talented, over-achieving, but annoying little sister who also has dragon powers. She takes pride in her ability to expose all of Jake's secrets and highlight her own. But despite all of that, she admires Jake's bravery, selflessness and ability as the American Dragon and sees him as a role model. It is hinted multiple times in the show that all her effort to be better than her brother is so she can impress him and get him to think of her as an equal. She knows that Jake would do anything for her, including forgetting all the problems she's ever caused between them, if it meant her safety. She wants to talk and hang out with him more.
 Susan Luong-Long (Lauren Tom): Jake and Haley's mother does not possess any natural dragon abilities like her family and children, having skipped her generation. She does all she can to keep her human husband Jonathan from discovering the existence of magic and her family being magical creatures.
 Jonathan Long (Jeff Bennett): Jake and Haley's mortal father, and a businessman originally from the Midwest, who is unaware that he is married into a family of dragons. In the series finale, he is initially shocked at his wife's family secret but later comes to welcome it as he always knew there was something magical about them.
 Rose/Huntsgirl (Mae Whitman): Jake's love interest (later girlfriend in the series finale) and a natural dragon slayer known as the Huntsgirl, a member of the Huntsclan that slays magical creatures, especially dragons. She was born with a red birthmark on her arm resembling a Chinese dragon, leading the Huntsclan to kidnap her from her parents. She also has an identical twin sister whose fate is unknown.
 Professor Hans Rotwood (Paul Rugg): is Jake's 57-year-old German schoolteacher with an obsessive interest in magical creatures, and a quest to discover the American Dragon's identity (oblivious to the fact that it is Jake). Professor Rotwood styles himself as an expert on mythical creatures, but his knowledge is superficial and his expertise a fraud.

Main villains
 The Huntsman (Jeff Bennett): The leader of the Huntsclan, a society of thieves that hunt and steal magical creatures for profit. They are highly trained and use sophisticated weapons. Huntsclan members have a specific birthmark that resembles a dragon. His true name and face were never shown. The Huntsman is #4 of the 13 threats to the magic community. In the second season, his outfit is redesigned as magenta and he sports a ninja mask and a dragon skull helmet. His face is finally revealed when his helmet is destroyed, and is ultimately killed by his protegee Rose.
 The Dark Dragon (Clancy Brown), the secondary main antagonist of the show. He became the new villain after The Huntsman's death in the episode "Homecoming"
 Bananas B (Adam Wylie): A monkey with a rapper style and Jake's temporary animal guardian who later betrayed him to become Councilor Chang's assistant. He talks with an Australian accent.
 Councilor Chang (Lauren Tom): A former member of the Dragon Council and the Dark Dragon's assistant who has teamed up with Lao Shi back when he first fought the Dark Dragon
 Eli Excelsior Pandarus (Jonathan Freeman) A dark wizard who tries to be the world's most powerful sorcerer

Recurring and guest
 Sun Park (Sandra Oh): Jake's home-ec schoolteacher, Haley's dragon mentor, and formerly the Korean Dragon.
 Nigel Thrall (Adam Wylie) An exchange student from England who hides his identity as a wizard. And shared a temporal rivalry with Jake when they both ran for school president but end up defeating Maximius together.
 Fred Nerk (Adam Wylie): The Australian Dragon who was Jake's temporary rival at the Dragon Council Games until he saves him from the Dark Dragon.
 Jasmine (Lacey Chabert): Jake's first date, who turned out to be a soul-sucking creature called a Nix.
 Huntsboy #88 and Huntsboy #89 (Kyle Massey & Nicholas Brendon): Two of the Huntsman's new apprentices, supposedly both cousins of Rose. 88 is as hip-hop and arrogant as Jake, which ironically shows Jake how annoying he can really be, while 89 is more of a nerd. Neither knows how to fight, and they were only accepted into the Huntsclan due to killing monsters in video games. 
 Brad Morton (Matt Nolan): A 15-year-old jock bully at Jake's school who likes to make fun of him and frequently hits on Rose.
 Sigmund Brock (Corey Burton): Rotwood's former mentor who inspired him to research magical creatures. He is brought in to replace Rotwood as Principal of Fillmore Middle School when Jake gets Rotwood fired but takes it upon himself to discover the dragon's identity causing Rotwood to team up with Jake and get him fired.
 Stacey Wintergrin (Tara Strong): The school's cheerleader captain who is Spud's unrequited love interest until the near end of the second season.
 Kara Oracle (Tara Strong): Sara's oracle twin sister is always in a bad mood, although she can only predict good things.
 Sara Oracle (Tara Strong): Kara's oracle twin sister is always happy, although she can only predict bad things.
 Veronica (Tara Strong): A half-human with eight spider legs who works at the Magus Bazaar.
 Bertha the Giant (Tara Strong): a dim-witted female giant with a stinky foot.
 Silver (Kari Wahlgren): a mermaid who is afraid of water and a medical science prodigy.
 Ms. Dolores Derceto (Susanne Blakeslee): An undercover mermaid detective working as the principal of Jake's junior high who has a temporary romance with Lao Shi.
 Danika Hunnicutt (Jessica DiCicco): Jake's second love interest after Rose went to Hong Kong and is the school's swim team captain. She gets mad and leaves him after he accuses her of being the siren. She later became Jake's graduation partner.
 Hank Carter (Phil Morris): Trixie's father, who is a US Navy officer.
 Olivia Mears (Liliana Mumy): Haley's academic rival.
 Yan Yan (Tia Carrere): A Sphynx cat, also known as a Chinese Hairless, who has been fighting with Fu Dog over his family's amulet over centuries. She pretends to belong to a young girl called Olivia.
 Huntsgirl #18 (Tara Strong): A student at The Huntsclan Academy who develops a crush on an undercover Spud due to his in-depth knowledge about dragons and fights over him with another student.

Voice cast

Main cast
 Dante Basco – Jake Long, Evil Jake
 Keone Young – Luong Lao Shi
 John DiMaggio – Fu Dog, SJO Wortz Security Guard, Blonde Undercover Henchman, Herbert, Brownie #2, Dwarf, Messenger Fairy, Antique Dealer, Leprechaun, Ogre, Police Officer #1
 Lauren Tom – Susan Long, Councilor Chang, Chorus Girl, Drill Sergeant, Middle-Aged Woman, Nurse
 Jeff Bennett – Jonathan Long, Councilor Kulde, Imp, The Huntsman, Leprechaun McBreen, Security Guard, Trick-or-Treatee, Huntsclan Academy Teacher, Police Officer #2
 Miss Kittie – Shaniqua Chulavista, Trixie Carter, Origami Girl, Mrs. McGuire, Courtney
 Amy Bruckner – Haley Long, Millie Fillmore
 Charlie Finn – Spud, Teenage Worker 
 Mae Whitman – Rose, Little Girl

Additional voices

 Sandra Oh – Sun Park
 Fred Tatasciore – Crewman #3
 Paul Rugg – Professor Hans Rotwood,  Triangle Boy
 Kyle Massey – Huntsboy #88
 Nicholas Brendon – Huntsboy #89
 Matt Nolan as Brad Morton
 Jonathan Freeman – Eli Excelsior Pandarus
 T'Keyah Crystal Keymáh – Mrs. Dorothy Carter, Mrs. Carter
 Tara Strong – Stacey Wintergrin, Kara Oracle, Sara Oracle, Veronica, Bertha the Giant
 Clancy Brown – The Dark Dragon
 Kari Wahlgren – Silver, Bride, Mermaid, Centaur, Wood Nymph
 Susanne Blakeslee – Ms. Dolores Derceto, Ms. Birch
 Clarence Williams III – Councilor Andam
 Jessica DiCicco – Danika Hunnicutt
 Adam Wylie – Nigel Thrall, Fred Nerk, Bananas B. Genius Nerdy Boy
 Macy Gray – Trixie's Grandmother and Miss Jenkins
 Monty Hall – Himself
 John Cygan – King Hammer's minion #3
 Edie McClurg – Tooth Fairy
 John C. McGinley – Dr. Diente
 Dee Bradley Baker – Leprechaun Brocamas
 Hynden Walch – Euryale
 Mindy Sterling – Mrs. Grumplestock, Pix McGee 
 Cathy Cavadini – Fury
 Steve Blum – King Hammer's minion #4
 Mark Hamill – Fisherman
 Diane Delano – Ophelia Ogelvy
 David Ogden Stiers as Narrator and Crewman #1
 Rob Paulsen – Groom, Head Counselor Jenkins
 Daryl Sabara – Hobie
 Dawnn Lewis - Huntsgirl #18
 Tom Kane – Crewman#3
 Vanessa Marshall – Harpie #3
 Liliana Mumy – Olivia Meers
 Tia Carrere – Yan Yan
 Josh Keaton – Huntsclan Member #4
 Paige Moss – Marnie Lockjelly
 Brenda Song – Tracey
 Frank Welker – Jake's dragon roaring
 James Arnold Taylor – Sam Spark
 Grey DeLisle – Harpie #1
 Annick Obonsawin – Harpie #2
 Corey Burton – Sigmund Brock
 Kevin Michael Richardson – Santa Claus
 Jim Ward – Huntsclan Member #6
 Rene Mujica – Kyle Wilkins	
 Stephen Tobolowsky – Troll
 Wendie Malick – Aunt Patchouli
 Tress MacNeille – Queen Lilliana, Ms. Spudinski
 Melissa Greenspan – Genius girl
 John Malkovich – Bodyguard
 Lacey Chabert – Jasmine
 Susan Blu – Jasmine as a Nix
 Diane Pershing – Huntsgirl #17
 Ron Masak as Marty
 Henry Gibson – Who is Luong Lao Shi Narrator
 Michaela Jill Murphy – Amanda
 Russell Horton - Dragon Councilor #1, Coney Island Announcer
 Sam Marin - Pooka Pooka
 Dan Castellaneta - Young Huntsman,
 Eddie Korbich - Coach Soccerson
 Amy Hill - Aunt Cathy
 Will Friedle – Cousin Gregory "Greggy"
 Laurence Fishburne – Huntsclan Member #1
 Kay Panabaker – Lacey 
 René Auberjonois – Huntsclan Member #3
 Laura Ortiz as Vickie
 Phil LaMarr – Hunstclan Member #5
 Phil Morris – Hank Carter
 Candi Milo – Annika
 George DiCenzo – Hunstclan Member #5, Additional Voices
 April Winchell – Rose's Mother
 Nathan Lane – Rose's Father
 Jennifer Hale – Huntsgirl #18
 Danny Cooksey – Huntsclan Member #2
 Nestor Carbonell – Cupid
 Fred Newman – Herbert the Goblin
 Dave Coulier – Petite messenger Fairy

Production

American Dragon: Jake Long was created by Jeff Goode (who also wrote the pilot for MTV's Undressed). The show was pitched to Disney Channel executives as an animated show in 2002. After being greenlit by Disney Channel, the pitch bible was then developed into its television adaptation with executive producers Matt Negrete (previously a writer on Fillmore!) and Eddie Guzelian (a writer and story editor for Kim Possible), with Christian Roman serving as director.

Disney Channel ordered an initial twenty-one 30-minute episodes the first season. The series premiered on January 21, 2005. It was initially scheduled for the fall of 2004, but was moved to January when Brandy & Mr. Whiskers was completed in time for its September debut.

The theme song was originally performed for the first season by the band Mavin.

In 2006 Disney Channel renewed the show for a second season. It had also been announced that Steve Loter, who had served as director of Kim Possible, would join the show for its second season as director and executive producer alongside Matt Negrete and Eddie Guzelian. However, following Disney Channel's renewal of Kim Possible for a fourth season, Loter would resume his role as the director but still serve as an executive producer of Jake Long. Nick Filippi, who had also done directorial work on Kim Possible, was assigned as the new director of Jake Long. With Steve Loter joining the staff, the show had all of its characters and backgrounds re-designed with new animation upon request by both Loter and the executives as they had disdain for the previous seasons' designs.

The theme song for season 2 was also re-recorded by The Jonas Brothers.

The show ended its run on September 1, 2007. After the show ended, reruns continued to air on Disney Channel's late-night lineup every night at 1:30am. The show was brought back to the daytime lineup weekdays at 2:00pm from October 1–5, 2007, and 1:00pm from October 9, 2007, to May 15, 2008. The show's late-night timeslot was moved to 2:30am on May 17, 2008, and to 3:00am on January 1, 2010. On May 7, 2010, the show started airing only 4 nights a week (Monday-Thursday), and the show was completely removed from Disney Channel after June 25, 2010. The series was syndicated to Toon Disney from February 20, 2006, to February 12, 2009. When Toon Disney was converted to Disney XD, the series was carried over and aired from February 14, 2009, to October 15, 2012.

Crossover with Lilo & Stitch
Jake Long and his allies come to Hawaii in an episode of Lilo & Stitch: The Series entitled "Morpholomew" to investigate one of Jumba's experiments, while Lilo enters a skateboarding competition in an attempt to impress her crush by winning a new skateboard for him while he's in Australia. Meanwhile, he and Stitch team up to stop Gantu and rescue the experiment.

Other media

Video games
Two video games based on the show were produced, one for the Nintendo DS and one for the Game Boy Advance.

 Attack of the Dark Dragon (DS) — released October 12, 2006
 Rise of the Huntsclan (GBA) — released October 12, 2006

Books
Jeff Goode has written two children's books about American Dragon which were released in 2004 – before the initial TV show started airing.

 American Dragon Book 1: The Dragon Hunter,  — released April 1, 2004
 American Dragon Book 2: The Gnome Eater,  — released May 1, 2004

Home media
The series was made available on Disney+ in the U.S. on February 26, 2021.

References

External links

 American Dragon: Jake Long at Jeff Goode's website
 
 

2000s American animated television series
2000s American superhero comedy television series
2005 American television series debuts
2007 American television series endings
American children's animated action television series
American children's animated adventure television series
American children's animated comedy television series
American children's animated fantasy television series
American children's animated superhero television series
Chinese mythology in popular culture
Disney Channel original programming
English-language television shows
Animated television series about dragons
Animated television series about dysfunctional families
Martial arts television series
Television series about shapeshifting
Teen animated television series
Teen superhero television series
Television series by Disney Television Animation
Television series by Rough Draft Studios
Television shows adapted into video games
Television shows set in New York City
Chinese American television
Jetix original programming
Anime-influenced Western animated television series
Crossover animated television series
Middle school television series
Jake Long
Jake Long
Jake Long